In Search of a Thrill is a 1923 American silent drama film directed by Oscar Apfel and starring Viola Dana, Warner Baxter, and Mabel Van Buren.

Cast

Preservation
A complete print of In Search of a Thrill is held by Gosfilmofond in Moscow.

References

Bibliography
 Munden, Kenneth White. The American Film Institute Catalog of Motion Pictures Produced in the United States, Part 1. University of California Press, 1997.

External links

1923 films
1923 drama films
Silent American drama films
Films directed by Oscar Apfel
American silent feature films
1920s English-language films
American black-and-white films
Metro Pictures films
1920s American films